Kattunayakar or Jennu Kurumbas are a designated scheduled tribe in the Indian states of Tamil Nadu, Karnataka, Kerala, and Andhra Pradesh.

The word Kattunayakar means the king of the jungle in Tamil and Malayalam. The Kattunayakar are one of the earliest known inhabitants of the Western Ghats, who are engaged in the collection and gathering of forest produce, mainly wild honey and wax.

The men wear short dhotis and half-sleeved shirts. The women attach a long single piece of cloth round their body just below the neck, leaving the shoulders and arms bare. Child marriages were common before the 1990s, but now the girls marry after attaining puberty. Monogamy is the general rule among the Kattunayakar community.

Recently, an Indian production short movie named “The Elephant Whisperers” won Oscar in short feature film. It’s based on Kattunayakar tribe.

Kattunayakar believe in Hinduism and have a language which is a mixture of all Dravidian languages. The main deity of the tribe is Lord Shiva and Nayakkar under the name of Bhairava. They also worship animals, birds, trees, rock hillocks, and snakes, along with the other Hindu deities.

Kattunayakar are fond of music, songs, and dancing. They are also called Cholanaickar and Pathinaickars.

Jennu Kurumba
In 1982, Kattunayakan and Jennu Kurumba were considered as two different tribes. In 1988, they were both considered the same tribe.

Kattunayakar in Kerala
Kattunayakar are one of the five ancient tribal groups in Kerala. They live very much in tune with nature. Hunting and collecting forest produce are the two main means of living for the Kattunayakar tribe. However, the restrictions to protect native forest and wildlife have forced them to find work outside the forests. Although willing to work for very low wages, unemployment and poverty are very severe among the Kattunayakan. Another important factor for the tribe is the medicinal system and its close association with the culture. They use traditional medicines for common ailments, but they use modern medicines in an emergency. Even then they only use modern medicine after seeking consent from "God" by the chieftain or priest (generally both roles are taken by the same person), through a well-defined set of traditional rituals or poojas.

References

Scheduled Tribes of Andhra Pradesh
Scheduled Tribes of Karnataka
Scheduled Tribes of Kerala
Scheduled Tribes of Tamil Nadu